Mike George is a British radio presenter. He was born in Harrow, Middlesex in 1945, a premature baby, as a result of the VE Celebrations. He attended Watford Central Primary and Bushey Grammar School. He spent most of his school holidays with his grandparents in Ross on Wye, which is how he developed his love of the counties of Hereford and Worcester.

Mike and his two sons have been lifelong supporters of Watford Football Club. He is married to Lin and they have four children and at the last count, five grandchildren.

Early career 
Mike spent ten years in the navy and eight years as a Medical Rep before discovering Hospital Radio.  His first professional radio job was in Portsmouth.

Mike joined Radio Wyvern (was Wyvern FM) (now Free Hereford and Worcester) in Worcester, when the station opened in 1982 as the weekday drive time presenter and later breakfast show presenter.

He left the station in 1987 and joined Cardiff's Red Dragon FM as a presenter of their breakfast show and was also heard on Touch AM.  He remained here until early 1992. During his time in South Wales Mike appeared in pantomime with the comedian and actor Stan Stennett, at Porthcawl.

BBC career 
In early 1992 Mike moved back to the Worcester area and joined BBC Hereford & Worcester, taking over the weekday mid-morning show from 10 am–1 pm.

In late 1996 he took over the weekday Breakfast show, a role he would remain on until retiring from the slot in April 2005.

Just before retiring from the Breakfast show, in January 2005 Mike took over the station's gardening Programme.  This was broadcast on Saturday mornings from 9–11 am. Here, Mike was joined by local gardening expert Reg Moule. He still hosts this show (July 2012).

In addition to that, from May 2005, Mike took over a three-hour Sunday afternoon show also on BBC Hereford & Worcester, playing classic pop tunes from the last three decades.  This show was also broadcast on BBC Radio Shropshire and BBC Radio Stoke.  It was also during this period that Mike was a stand-in presenter, covering for many holidaying presenters on BBC Hereford & Worcester, BBC Radio Shropshire and BBC Radio Gloucestershire

Current work 
Mike now presents the Sunday Breakfast programme on BBC Radio Shropshire Mike also presents the 7-10pm slot on Tuesdays on BBC Hereford and Worcester with sport and 'Essential 80's'. BBC Hereford & Worcester

Mike retired in August 2013 and he and his wife went travelling for 10 months.

References 

Living people
English radio DJs
Year of birth missing (living people)